The 2007 Formula BMW World Final was the third Formula BMW World Final race and held for the second time at Circuit Ricardo Tormo in Cheste near Valencia on 23–25 November 2007. The shorter layout of the  length was used. The race was won by Mücke Motorsport's driver Philipp Eng, who finished ahead Marco Wittmann and Jens Klingmann.

Drivers and teams

Qualifying

Group 1

Group 2

Super Pole Competition

Heats

Heat 1 (A vs B)

Heat 2 (C vs D)

Heat 3 (A vs C)

Heat 4 (B vs D)

Heat 5 (A vs D)

Heat 6 (B vs C)

Summary

Final Race

References

Formula BMW seasons
BMW World Final
BMW World Final